Vernon Independent School District is a public school district based in Vernon, Texas (USA).

The district serves a large portion of Wilbarger County and extends into a small portion of northeastern Foard County.

In 2009, the school district was rated "academically acceptable" by the Texas Education Agency.

Schools
Vernon High School (Grades 9-12)
Vernon Middle School (Grades 6-8)
Shive Elementary School (Grades 4-5)
Central Elementary School (Grades 2-3)
T.G. McCord Elementary School (Grades PK-1)

References

External links
Vernon ISD

School districts in Wilbarger County, Texas
School districts in Foard County, Texas